John Woodring (born April 4, 1959) is a former American football linebacker. He played for the New York Jets from 1981 to 1985.

References

1959 births
Living people
American football linebackers
Brown Bears football players
New York Jets players